Rose Hill Burial Park is a historic cemetery in Oklahoma City. It was established in 1915 by Charles H. Moureau and the Harden Realty Company. A mausoleum at the cemetery was built in 1919. Gravesites for notable figures in Oklahoma and Oklahoma City's history are part of the cemetery.

The cemetery was vandalized in 1990. In 2016, Boy Scouts handed out small American flags and helped families locate gravesites on Memorial Day at the cemetery.

Gravesites
Notable gravesites include:
 Plato Andros, pro football player
 John H. Burford, judge on the Oklahoma Supreme Court
 Jan Eric Cartwright, Attorney General of Oklahoma
 Cot Deal, MLB player and coach
 Scott Ferris, US Representative
 William J. Holloway, Governor of Oklahoma
 Noah Hutchings, broadcaster
 John Jarman, US Representative
 Robert S. Kerr, Governor of Oklahoma, later reinterred to family homestead in Ada, Oklahoma
 Travis M. Kerr, businessman, Thoroughbred racehorse owner
 Glen A. Larson, television writer, creator of Battlestar Galactica, Knight Rider and Magnum, P.I.
 James V. McClintic, US Representative
 Bobby Murcer, MLB outfielder and broadcaster
 Jimmy Reece, racecar driver
 Gomer Griffith Smith, US Representative
 Ulysses S. Stone, US Representative
 Joseph Bradfield Thoburn, historian
 Roy J. Turner, governor
 Lawrence Walsh, lawyer, judge, and US Deputy Attorney General
 Jack C. Walton, Governor of Oklahoma
 Lloyd Waner, Hall of Fame baseball player
 Muriel Hazel Wright, historian of Oklahoma

References

External links
 
 

1915 establishments in Oklahoma
Cemeteries in Oklahoma
Oklahoma City